Bryzgalovo is a rural locality (a village) in Bryzgalovskoye Rural Settlement, Kameshkovsky District, Vladimir Oblast, Russia. The population was 234 as of 2010.

Geography 
Bryzgalovo is located 14 km northeast of Kameshkovo (the district's administrative centre) by road. Nazarovo is the nearest rural locality.

References 

Rural localities in Kameshkovsky District